Wayde Butler (born December 25, 1969) is a former American football wide receiver who played one season with the Edmonton Eskimos of the Canadian Football League (CFL). He played college football at the University of Southwestern Louisiana. He was also a member of the San Diego Chargers of the National Football League (NFL). Butler played in the East-West Shrine Game in 1993.

Professional career
Butler was signed by the NFL's San Diego Chargers on May 4, 1993 after going undrafted in the 1993 NFL Draft. He was released by the Chargers on August 30, 1993. He signed with the Edmonton Eskimos of the CFL in October 1993. Butler played in three games for the Eskimos during the 1993 season. He spent the 1994 off-season with the San Diego Chargers. He was released by the Chargers on August 22, 1994.

References

External links
Just Sports Stats
College stats

Living people
1969 births
American football wide receivers
Canadian football wide receivers
American players of Canadian football
Louisiana Ragin' Cajuns football players
San Diego Chargers players
Edmonton Elks players
Players of American football from Texas
Sportspeople from Beaumont, Texas